Levi Thomson,  (February 17, 1855 – April 14, 1938) was a farmer, lawyer, and political figure in Saskatchewan, Canada. He represented Qu'Appelle in the House of Commons of Canada from 1911 to 1921 as a Liberal and then Unionist member.

He was born in Erin Township, Canada West, the son of John Thomson, a native of Scotland, and Sarah McMillan. He began the study of law in Toronto but then moved west in 1882, settling on a farm in Wolseley. In 1884, he married Mabel Maud Perley, the daughter of William Dell Perley. Thomson completed his legal studies in Regina in 1894 and practised law in Wolseley. He served as crown prosecutor from 1897 to 1904, resigning to run unsuccessfully for a seat in the House of Commons. Thomson was an unsuccessful candidate for a seat in the Saskatchewan assembly in 1905. In 1913, he was named King's Counsel. He served on the council for Wolseley from 1889 to 1903 and was mayor in 1904. Thomson also served on the board of governors for the University of Saskatchewan. He died in Wolseley at the age of 83.

Electoral record

References 

Members of the House of Commons of Canada from Saskatchewan
Liberal Party of Canada MPs
Mayors of places in Saskatchewan
1855 births
1938 deaths
Canadian King's Counsel